Genome Biology and Evolution is a monthly peer-reviewed open access scientific journal published by Oxford University Press on behalf of the Society for Molecular Biology and Evolution. It covers research on the interface between evolutionary biology and genomics. According to the Journal Citation Reports, the journal's 2021 impact factor is 4.07.

External links
 
 Submission website
 Society for Molecular Biology and Evolution

References

Genetics journals
Oxford University Press academic journals
Monthly journals
English-language journals
Publications established in 2009